Aitkin is a city in Aitkin County, Minnesota, United States. The population was 2,168 at the 2020 census. It is the county seat of Aitkin County.

History
Before the establishment of City of Aitkin, a transient community of Lexington was located at the mouth of the Ripple River, at its confluence with the Mississippi River. However, maps from the 1860s erroneously depict the village of Ojibway (or Ogibeway) at the mouth of the Ripple River. (Today the town here is known as Riverton.)

Due to the importance of regional trade at Lexington, the route of the Northern Pacific Railroad was planned to pass near there.  Aitkin was founded in 1870 when the Northern Pacific Railroad was extended to that point, replacing and annexing Lexington. The city and county were named for William Alexander Aitken, a partner of the American Fur Company and chief factor of the company's regional operations in the early 19th century.

The development of industries attracted people to the town. In the late 19th and early 20th century, a massive wave of immigrants, mostly from present-day Ireland, Germany, and Scandinavian countries, moved into the Aitkin area to work in the logging and riverboat industries.  They were able to start working before they had learned much English.

After the Great Depression and World War II, the logging industry declined. The area developed as a farming community, based on production of cattle and poultry, which continued until the late 1970s to early 1980s. A creamery  and a turkey plant were important to the town's economy. With the decline of small family farms in agriculture, many abandoned farms can be seen throughout the county.

By the 1990s, Aitkin had changed again, developing as a community for retirement and tourism, especially with its lake areas. The tourism and service industries are central today. Health care, education, human services, and non-profit organizations are some of the major contributors to the modern-day Aitkin economy, along with the hospitality industry.

Aitkin has been affected by occasional flooding of the Mississippi River. The 2012 flood was one of the first floods that overflowed into the lake areas, flooding the cabins, since it was caused by heavy rainfall instead of melting snow.

Five properties in Aitkin are listed on the National Register of Historic Places: the 1901 Patrick Casey House, the 1902 Potter/Casey Company Building, the 1911 Aitkin Carnegie Library, the 1916 Northern Pacific Depot, and the Aitkin County Courthouse and Jail (built in 1920 and 1915, respectively).

Geography

The Mississippi River flows through the northern edge of Aitkin. The Ripple River and Sissabagamah Creek both flow nearby.

Climate

Demographics

2010 census
As of the census of 2010, there were 2,165 people, 936 households, and 483 families residing in the city. The racial makeup of the city was 95.5% White, 0.8% African American, 1.5% Native American, 0.3% Asian, 0.1% from other races, and 1.6% from two or more races. Hispanic or Latino of any race were 1.2% of the population.

There were 936 households, of which 27.2% had children under the age of 18 living with them, 33.8% were married couples living together, 13.5% had a female householder with no husband present, 4.4% had a male householder with no wife present, and 48.4% were non-families. 43.5% of all households were made up of individuals, and 25.1% had someone living alone who was 65 years of age or older. The average household size was 2.08 and the average family size was 2.88.

The median age in the city was 44.3 years. 22.2% of residents were under the age of 18; 7.2% were between the ages of 18 and 24; 21.4% were from 25 to 44; 22% were from 45 to 64; and 27.1% were 65 years of age or older. The gender makeup of the city was 45.3% male and 54.7% female.

2000 census
As of the census of 2000, there were 1,984 people, 892 households, and 434 families residing in the city. The racial makeup of the city was 97.33% White, 0.15% African American, 1.31% Native American, 0.25% Asian, 0.05% Pacific Islander, 0.35% from other races, and 0.55% from two or more races. Hispanic or Latino of any race were 0.76% of the population. 30.4% were of German, 16.6% Swedish, 12.3% Norwegian and 6.5% Irish.

There were 892 households, out of which 22.5% had children under the age of 18 living with them, 36.5% were married couples living together, 9.8% had a female householder with no husband present, and 51.3% were non-families. 46.5% of all households were made up of individuals, and 30.2% had someone living alone who was 65 years of age or older.  The average household size was 2.03 and the average family size was 2.90.

In the city, the population was spread out, with 20.8% under the age of 18, 7.5% from 18 to 24, 21.6% from 25 to 44, 17.6% from 45 to 64, and 32.4% who were 65 years of age or older.  The median age was 45 years. For every 100 females, there were 76.2 males.  For every 100 females age 18 and over, there were 69.8 males.

The median income for a household in the city was $47,574, and the median income for a family was $58,071. Males had a median income of $50,577 versus $31,641 for females. The per capita income for the city was $26,471.  About 7.1% of families and 9.2% of the population were below the poverty line, including 11.0% of those under age 18 and 20.9% of those age 65 or over.

Arts and culture

Annual cultural events
The city's annual festivals include:
Riverboat Heritage Days - the first weekend in August.
The Aitkin County Fair - annually at the middle of July since 2008.
County Road Classics Fly-In Drive In takes place on the last Sunday in June.  As of 2022, this event will be a part of Riverboat Heritage Days.
Ripplesippi Music Fest - in mid August.
World Famous Fish House Parade takes place on Black Friday, the day after Thanksgiving. This event was noted in a 2003 documentary which aired on the Home and Garden Channel in the United States.

Education
Aitkin Public Schools are part of the Aitkin Public School District. Aitkin High School educates students in grades seven through twelve in the Aitkin School District. Rippleside Elementary educates students grades preschool to sixth grade.

Infrastructure

Transportation
The Aitkin Municipal Airport is located at the northeast side of the city of Aitkin.

Major highways
The following routes are located within the city of Aitkin.

  U.S. Highway 169
  Minnesota State Highway 47
  Minnesota State Highway 210
 Aitkin County Road 1
 Aitkin County Road 12
 Aitkin County Road 15
 Aitkin County Road 41

Media

The Aitkin Independent Age is a weekly newspaper in Aitkin.  It was founded in 1883.

Notable people

 Franklin E. Ebner, Minnesota legislator and lawyer
 Jonathan Edwards: Singer/Songwriter, best known for his hit Sunshine
 Leif Enger: American author
 Francis Lee Jaques: American wildlife painter 
 Jean Keene: known nationwide as the "Eagle Lady" of the Homer Spit
 Robert Kerlan: orthopedic surgeon known for his contributions to sports medicine
 Gordon W. McKay: Oregon businessman and politician
 Marlin B. Nelsen, Minnesota chiropractor and politician
 David E. Rued, Minnesota politician, farmer, and educator
 Warren William: notable Broadway and film actor with a star on the Hollywood Walk of Fame
 Edwin M. Wold, Minnesota politician and businessman

American film actress and singer Judy Garland performed at the opera house in Aitkin as a young child.  A small display related to Garland can be found in the converted opera house, now The Butler Building, in downtown Aitkin.

References

External links

City website
Aitkin Area Chamber of Commerce Website

Cities in Aitkin County, Minnesota
Cities in Minnesota
County seats in Minnesota
Minnesota populated places on the Mississippi River
Mining communities in Minnesota